Miss World 1969, the 19th edition of the Miss World pageant, was held for the first time at the Royal Albert Hall on 27 November 1969, broadcast for the first time in colour by the BBC. 50 delegates vied for the crown won by Eva Rueber-Staier of Austria. She was crowned by actor Omar Sharif, not by Miss World 1968 winner Penelope Plummer of Australia.

Results

Contestants

  – Graciela Marino
  – Stefane Meurer
  – Eva Rueber-Staier 
  – Wanda Pearce
  – Maud Alin
  – Ana Cristina Rodrigues
  – Jacquie Perrin
  – Ana María Nazar
  – Lina María García Ogliastri
  – Damaris Ureña
  – Flora Diaouri
  – Marcela Bitnarova
  – Jeanne Perfeldt
  – Sandra Simone Cabrera Cabral
  – Ximena Aulestia Díaz
  – Päivi Ilona Raita
  – Suzanne Angly
  – Marie Carayol
  – Christa Margraf 
  – Marilou Chiappe
  – Heleni Alexopoulou
  – Pamela Patricia Lord 
  – Nente van der Vliet
  – Ragnheiður Pétursdóttir
  – Adina Shellim
  – Hillary Clarke
  – Tehila Selah
  – Marlyn Elizabeth Taylor
  – Emiko Karashima
  – Kim Seung-hee
  – Roula Majzoub
  – Antoinette Coleman
  – Jacqueline Schaeffer
  – Mary Brincat
  – Gloria Leticia Hernández Martín del Campo
  – Carole Robinson
  – Carlota Marina Brenes López
  – Morenike Faribido
  – Kjersti Jortun
  – Blanca Zaldívar
  – Feliza Teresa Miro
  – Sylvia Labonte
  – Linda Meryl Collett
  – Ing-Marie Ahlin
  – Astrid Vollenweider
  – Zohra Tabania
  – Sermin Elmasi
  – Sheena Drummond
  – Gail Renshaw
  – Marzia Rita Gisela Piazza Suprani 
  – Radmila Živković

Notes

Debuts

Withdraws 

  – Pauline Chai Siew Phin

Returns

Last competed in 1959:
 
Last competed in 1967:

References

External links
 Pageantopolis – Miss World 1969

Miss World
1969 in London
1969 beauty pageants
Beauty pageants in the United Kingdom
Events at the Royal Albert Hall
November 1969 events in the United Kingdom